The Very Best is a  compilation album by American band Earth, Wind & Fire issued in 1994 on Versailles Records. The album was certified Double Gold in France by the SNEP.

Track listing

Certifications

References

1994 compilation albums
Earth, Wind & Fire compilation albums